Cucumber plant defense mechanism is a putative effect of cucumbers (Cucumis sativis) having a class of phytochemicals  cucurbitacins  with aroma or taste properties that discourage natural foraging by herbivores, such as insects, nematodes or wildlife. Cucumbers are crops commonly cultivated worldwide for food. As a possible defense mechanism, cucumbers produce volatile organic compounds, such as cucurbitacin C, which causes a bitter taste in some cucumber varieties. This potential mechanism is under preliminary research to identify whether or not cucumbers are able to deter herbivores and environmental stresses by using an intrinsic chemical defense.

Biosynthesis of cucurbitacin C 
Although it is not clear what receptor activates the biosynthesis of cucurbitacin C, hydrogen sulfide (H2S) acts as a signaling molecule and promotes the synthesis of cucurbitacin C. H2S does this through sulfhydration modification of two transcription factors which induces the expression of Bi and Bt which are the cucurbitacin C encoding genes. This significantly increases the amount of cucurbitacin C in the leaves, cotyledons, pedicel, carpopodium, and fruit. He et al. conducted an experiment on terpene synthases in cucumbers in 2021 and found that control cucumber leaves contained lower amounts of terpenoids (cucurbitacin C) compared to those that were being fed on by spider mites or thrips.

Research 
Balkema-Boomstra et al. conducted an experiment in 2003 testing the role of cucurbitacin C in spider mite resistance to cucumbers. There were four successive experiments performed where three and four week old plants were tested. A leaf disk was cut from each of these plants to be tested. These disks were placed upside down in a tray lined with filter paper and moistened with a 10 ppm benzimidazole solution. The trays were then sealed with a transparent cover. Three nonsynchronized female spider mites were placed on each disk. The disks were then incubated at 25°C for 24 hours. Following this time, the spider mites were removed, and the number of eggs produced were counted. The disks were further incubated at 25°C for about 10 days until the next generation of adult spider mites could be counted. The results were analyzed by a regression analysis using Genstat. There was a major negative correlation between spider mite survival and cucurbitacin C amount.

References 

Wikipedia Student Program

Plants by adaptation
Biosynthesis